The enzyme prenyl-diphosphatase (EC 3.1.7.1) catalyzes the reaction

prenyl diphosphate + H2O  prenol + diphosphate

This enzyme belongs to the family of hydrolases, specifically those acting on diphosphoric monoester bonds.  The systematic name is prenyl-diphosphate diphosphohydrolase. Other names in common use include prenyl-pyrophosphatase, prenol pyrophosphatase, and prenylphosphatase.

References

EC 3.1.7
Enzymes of unknown structure